The 1941 CCCF Championship was the first CCCF Championship, a tournament conducted between the years of 1941–1961. It was sanctioned by the Confederacion Centroamericana y del Caribe de Futbol (Football Confederation of Central America and the Caribbean), the association football governing body for Central America and the nations in the Caribbean prior to 1961, when it was replaced by CONCACAF.

Following are the results of the Final Group of the first Championship, which was hosted by Costa Rica:

Final standings

Results

 Some sources attribute this goal to either Hans Nahar or Mario Hernandez

Goal scorers
8 goals
  José Rafael Meza

7 goals
  Hans Nahar

6 goals
  Jesús María Araya

4 goals
  Aquilino Rosales

3 goals

  Federico Jansen
  Guillermo Pardo
  René Gutiérrez
  Antonio Toledo

2 goals

  Aníbal Varela
  Humberto Panneflek
  Gustavo Donado
  René Méndez
  Virgilio Castro
  Luis Carlos Rangel

1 goal

  Alfonso Arnáez
  Reinaldo Bernabela
  Alejandro Contreras
  Dolores Morales
  Pedro Robleto
  James Santiago Anderson
  Antoine Neville

Own Goals

  Mantainés (for Costa Rica)
  Abraham Rocha (for Costa Rica)

Notes:

External links
 CCCF Championship on RSSSF Archive

CCCF Championship
Cccf Championship, 1941
International association football competitions hosted by Costa Rica
CCCF
1941 in Central American sport
1941 in Costa Rica
May 1941 sports events
Sports competitions in San José, Costa Rica
20th century in San José, Costa Rica